Alexei Barsov (born 3 April 1966) is an Uzbekistani chess Grandmaster.

Chess career 
Barsov, lawyer by education, has been a professional chess player since the early 1990s, and is one of the premier players in Uzbekistan. For some years he was the coach of the former FIDE world champion Rustam Kasimdzhanov.

He won the Zeeland Open in Vlissingen in 1995. Barsov's victories in Oxford (1998) and York (1999, together with Tiger Hillarp Persson and Julian Hodgson) rate among his most prominent successes in international chess tournaments. In 2001 he won the Hastings International Chess Congress together with Harikrishna and Sasikiran. Barsov competed in the FIDE World Chess Championship 2004, losing in the first round to Alexander Beliavsky. He won a tournament in Saint-Quentin 2004, and Casablanca 2005. Barsov won the Uzbekistani Chess Championship in 2006 and 2010. In 2011, he came first in the 4th Beirut Open tournament. In the following year, Barsov tied for first place with Semetey Tologontegin at the 2nd Central Asia Chess Cup in Bishkek winning the tournament on tiebreak score.

Barsov represented Uzbekistan at the Chess Olympiads in Istanbul 2000, Calvià 2004, Turin 2006, Dresden 2008 and Khanty-Mansiysk 2010. He has played for several European chess clubs, including the ones competing in the German Chess Bundesliga.

Notable games
Alexei Barsov vs Zhong Zhang, Premier 2001, Nimzo-Indian Defense: Three Knights Variation (E21), 1-0
Peter K Wells vs Alexei Barsov, Premier 2002, English Opening: Agincourt Defense (A13), 0-1

References

External links 
Alexei Barsov chess games at 365Chess.com

1966 births
Living people
Chess grandmasters
Chess Olympiad competitors
Uzbekistani chess players
Chess players at the 2006 Asian Games
Chess players at the 2010 Asian Games
Asian Games competitors for Uzbekistan